Adrià is a Catalan masculine given name, related to the English Adrian or Hadrian. It may refer to:

Given named
Adrià Arjona (born 1996), Spanish footballer
Adrià Carmona (born 1992), Spanish professional footballer
Adrià Collado (born 1972), Spanish actor
Adrià Delgado (born 1990), water polo player from Brazil
Adrià or Adrián Díaz (born 1990), Spanish ice dancer
Adrià Figueras (born 1988), Spanish handball player
Adrià Gallego (born 1990), Spanish professional footballer
Adrià Granell (born 1986), Spanish footballer
Adrià Gual (1872–1943), Catalan playwright and theatre businessman
Adrià Guerrero (born 1998), Spanish footballer
Adrià Muñoz (born 1994), Spanish footballer
Adrià Ortolá (born 1993), Spanish professional footballer
Adrià Pina (born 1959), Spanish painter from L’Alcudia, Valencia
Adrià Puntí (born 1963), musician, singer-songwriter and actor

See also
Adria (given name)
Adria (disambiguation)
Adria
Adrian

Masculine given names
Spanish masculine given names